Rosso relativo is Tiziano Ferro's debut album, released in autumn of 2001 in Italy and EU. The album was later released in the rest of the world in 2002 and 2003.

The first single of the album was "Xdono", which became a #1 hit in his home country of Italy and earned Ferro popularity among the rest of Europe and the Americas. Ferro also released a Spanish version of the album called Rojo relativo, which made him famous in countries such as Mexico, the rest of South America and Puerto Rico.

The single "Perdona" was well received in Latin American countries, but it was not until the release of the single "Alucinado" that Ferro was established as an international star in Latin America.

Commercial reception
The album, through its many editions for different parts of the world, is still the most commercially successful release from the singer, with more than 2.5 million copies sold worldwide. Its singles also managed to obtain good positions on radio charts in many countries outside of Italy.

The single "Xdono" from the album made Ferro known to the general public and obtained a flattering 3rd place in the best-selling singles in Europe in 2002, placing only after singles by worldwide superstars Eminem and Shakira.'The Spanish single "Alucinado", from the Spanish-language version of the album, further solidified Ferro's career in Latin America, obtaining #1 placings in the charts of Mexico, Chile and Spain, as well as becoming a top five hit on the U.S. Billboard'' Hot Latin Songs. In Turkey, Tiziano Ferro's Rosso Relativo album was released on 6 June 2003.

Track listing

Charts

Weekly charts

Year-end charts

Certifications and sales

|-
!scope="row"|Turkey (Mü-YAP)
|Gold
|100,000x
|-

References

External links
 Tiziano Ferro Official Site

Tiziano Ferro albums
2001 albums
2002 albums
2003 albums
Italian-language albums
Spanish-language albums
EMI Records albums
European Border Breakers Award-winning albums